East Guildford may refer to:

East Guildford, Western Australia
East Guildford railway station

See also
Guildford (disambiguation)